Chapora is a coastal village at Chapora River estuary lying alongside a beach stretch in North Goa that is around 10 km. from Mapusa, a City in Northern Goa. It is close to Chapora Fort, an old Adilshahi fort. Chapora is also close to a trawler-fishing jetty. Chapora is home to many cheapest travel accommodation houses found in entire Northern Goa. There is a famous Ganesh fruit juice center in Chapora selling organic juices and gathering people from around.

It has many Historic Churches of Holy Cross, Nossa Senhora De Nesessidade (Our Lady Of Necessities), etc.; and old Shrine belonging to Shree Siddheshwar in the Cave, close to the Chapora Jetty.

References 

Beaches of Goa
Beaches of North Goa district